Nicolás Urcelay (20 December 1919 – 1 July 1959) was a Mexican singer.

Selected filmography
 Desired (1951)

1959 deaths
1919 births
Mexican pianists
20th-century pianists
Male pianists
20th-century Mexican male singers
People from Mérida, Yucatán
Musicians from Yucatán (state)